Lynda Bellingham OBE (31 May 194819 October 2014) was an English actress, broadcaster and author. She acted in television series such as All Creatures Great and Small, Doctor Who, Second Thoughts and Faith in the Future. She was also known for her appearances as the mother in the long-running series of "Oxo Family" British TV advertisements between 1983 and 1999, and as a panellist on the ITV lunchtime chat show Loose Women between 2007 and 2011.

Early life
Bellingham was born Meredith Hughes in Montreal to a single mother, but was given up for adoption because she was born out of wedlock in a strict church-going family. She was adopted when she was four months old. Bellingham was educated at Aylesbury High School and trained at the Central School of Speech and Drama.

Film and television

Acting
Bellingham made her television début as a nurse in an ITV afternoon soap opera of the 1970s, General Hospital. Her early film credits included roles in Confessions of a Driving Instructor (1976), Stand Up, Virgin Soldiers (1977) and Riding High (1981) with Eddie Kidd. She also appeared in the comedy short The Waterloo Bridge Handicap (1978) with Leonard Rossiter. Prior to her brief role in Sweeney! (1977), the first big-screen adaptation of the TV police drama series The Sweeney, she had appeared in the Sweeney episode "Trojan Bus" (1975) in which she played Nancy King, accomplice to two Australian robbers. In 1981, she appeared in the ITV comedy-drama Funny Man set in the music hall of the late 1920s.

Her other roles included Helen Herriot in the James Herriot drama All Creatures Great and Small (in which she was the second actress to play the role on television, replacing Carol Drinkwater), the 1980 Andrea Newman drama series Mackenzie, Blake's 7 (1981) and the situation comedy Second Thoughts and its sequel, Faith in the Future. With her Oxo Family co-star, Michael Redfern she appeared in an episode of Filthy Rich and Catflap.

Bellingham appeared as the Inquisitor in the 14-part Doctor Who serial The Trial of a Time Lord in 1986. She reprised the character for the Big Finish Productions audio series Gallifrey, and in the Big Finish Productions audio drama Trial of the Valeyard, (which she recorded only a few months before announcing her cancer). She starred as Emily Marlowe in the film The Scarlet Tunic in 1998, and appeared in Gleb Panfilov's The Romanovs: A Crowned Family as Empress Alexandra the following year.  She was in Waking the Dead A Simple Sacrifice (2001) parts one and two playing Mary Mantel.

From 2000 to 2003, Bellingham played Pauline Farnell, the compassionate accountant in At Home with the Braithwaites with Amanda Redman and former All Creatures Great and Small colleague Peter Davison. She had a recurring role in The Bill as villainess Irene Radford for several months in 2004, and appeared as Marlene in Devil's Gate the same year. She also appeared in Midsomer Murders “The Fisher King” as Jane Willows. She had a role in the ITV comedy Bonkers playing Mrs Wadlow, a man-eating suburban housewife who seduces her neighbour's teenage son and turns him into her gigolo. Later that year, she filmed guest appearances in episodes of Love Soup and Robin Hood.  She played DCI Karen Hardwick in a 2007 episode of New Tricks (S4:E1).

Television commercials
Bellingham played the central character in the long-running "Oxo Family" series of TV commercials, starting in 1983, playing a mother who binds her family together by cooking them meals featuring Oxo products. The advertisements typically featured the family sitting down to a meal at which Oxo gravy would be served. Throughout the 1980s and 1990s, the family was seen to grow older. When the campaign was retired in 1999, the family moved out of the house.

Television presenting
On 17 December 2010, Bellingham guest-presented the ITV programme Lorraine.

In 2012, she presented her own cookery series called My Tasty Travels with Lynda Bellingham. The following year, she presented the ITV programme Country House Sunday.

Loose Women
Bellingham joined Loose Women on 10 April 2007, appearing alongside Carol McGiffin and Coleen Nolan, and continued as a regular on the show until 2011. In all, Bellingham made more than 300 appearances on the show, including a special appearance in 2014 shortly before her death. Two editions of Loose Women were dedicated to Bellingham after her death.

Strictly Come Dancing

In 2009, Bellingham was one of the contestants in the seventh series of Strictly Come Dancing, where she was partnered with Darren Bennett. However, she was voted out by the judges in the fourth week.

Other appearances
In 1993, Bellingham was the subject of This Is Your Life when she was surprised by Michael Aspel on the set of Second Thoughts.

In February 1999, she was part of the Heated Rollers comedy team alongside Gwyneth Strong and Joanna Monro, with the Heated Rollers programme being the first all-women sketch show broadcast on BBC Radio 2.
 
In 2010, Bellingham was the voice-over for British rap band N-Dubz's reality show on Channel 4.

In 2011, Bellingham featured in a short film entitled Too Close for Comfort, playing the character of a mother to her real-life son, actor and celebrity butler Michael Peluso (from ITV's fly-on-the-wall documentary series The Savoy).  Bellingham and Peluso reprised their roles for the follow-up web series of the same name in 2014. Mirroring Bellingham's personal life, her character had developed cancer.

Bellingham also appeared as a contestant on the TV show Celebrity Who Wants To Be A Millionaire?

Live performances
Twice in the 1960s, Bellingham appeared in the Pendley Open Air Shakespeare Festival.

In January 2005, she appeared in a play entitled Losing Louis at Hampstead Theatre before transferring to the Trafalgar Studios in London. Her performance received critical acclaim, especially from Michael Billington.

In October 2007, she appeared in the play Vincent River at the Trafalgar Studios in London.

From September 2008 to July 2009, Bellingham played the role of Chris Harper in the stage version of the hit film Calendar Girls on tour and at the Noël Coward Theatre in the West End. She returned to the show for further tours in 2010, 2011 and 2012.

Over the Christmas/New Year period of 2011/12, she played the Fairy Godmother in the pantomime Cinderella at the Birmingham Hippodrome. She played the role again at the Alhambra Theatre, Bradford over the Christmas/New Year period of 2012/13.

Bellingham was due to star in Kay Mellor's play A Passionate Woman at the Sheffield Crucible, followed by a national tour, however, it was announced in July 2013 that the show had to be postponed owing to Bellingham's cancer treatment.

Filmography

Stage

Writing
In 2010, Bellingham launched her book Lost and Found, a story of her life and career and toured the country for private readings. Her novel Tell Me Tomorrow was published in 2013. In 2014, Bellingham's autobiography, There's Something I'm Dying to Tell You, was issued shortly before her death. Her final story, The Boy I Love was published posthumously in November 2014.

Personal life
Bellingham was married three times, first in 1975 to film and theatre producer Greg Smith. According to Bellingham in her 2010 autobiography, the marriage was one driven primarily by sex, with Smith later admitting to numerous affairs with other actresses, including some who sent nude photos to their home.

Her second marriage (1981–96) was to restaurateur Nunzio Peluso, with whom she had two sons, Michael and Robbie. The couple were introduced to each other at the Italian restaurant La Famiglia in Chelsea, London in the early 1980s by friend and fellow actor Christopher Biggins. After a whirlwind courtship and romance, the couple married but the relationship was marred by Peluso's jealousy of Bellingham's former lovers leading to a series of altercations, fights and domestic abuse towards her. Around the same time as Bellingham was being abused by Peluso, she was starring in the Oxo adverts and felt bound to hide the truth about her marriage for fear of spoiling her image in the commercials. As Bellingham revealed in her 2010 autobiography Lost & Found: My Story: "maybe if my private life had been happier I would have enjoyed doing it more. As it was, I felt I was living a lie. Being the nation's favourite mum on screen and going home to an abusive relationship was heartbreaking [...] the irony was horrific. Here I was, the Oxo mum, hiding behind closed doors, isolated from her friends and family." The couple divorced in 1996, Bellingham giving her former husband half of everything she owned, although he continued to intimidate her. A restraining order was granted in 2000 to keep Peluso away from his former wife. On 31 May 2008, Bellingham married her boyfriend, Spain-based timeshare salesman, Michael Pattemore (known on Loose Women as "Mr Spain"), at St Stephen Walbrook on her 60th birthday.

Bellingham was appointed Officer of the Order of the British Empire (OBE) in the 2014 New Year Honours for voluntary service to charitable giving.

Illness and death
On 16 July 2013, it was announced that Bellingham had been diagnosed with colorectal cancer. She released a statement saying she was "not going to die."

In September 2014, Bellingham confirmed that her cancer had metastasised to her lungs and liver and that she had "months to live". She announced that she had made the choice in August 2014 to stop chemotherapy in November, so that she could have "one last Christmas" with her family and die in January 2015. Bellingham died in a London hospital on 19 October 2014 with her husband Michael by her side.

On 3 November 2014, her funeral took place at St Bartholomew's Church in Crewkerne. Bellingham was buried in Crewkerne Townsend Cemetery. Her headstone names her as Lynda Bellingham-Pattemore.

Further reading
 Lynda Bellingham, Lost and Found: My Story (Ebury Press, 2010) 
 Lynda Bellingham, Tell Me Tomorrow (Simon & Schuster Ltd, 2014)  
 Lynda Bellingham, There's Something I've Been Dying to Tell You (Coronet, 2014) 
 Lynda Bellingham, "tell me tomorrow" (Simon & Schuster Ltd, 2013)

References

External links
 Official website (2014 snapshot from Internet Archive)

1948 births
2014 deaths
Actresses from Montreal
Alumni of the Royal Central School of Speech and Drama
Anglophone Quebec people
Canadian emigrants to the United Kingdom
Canadian expatriates in England
Deaths from cancer in England
Deaths from colorectal cancer
English stage actresses
English television actresses
English film actresses
English television presenters
English women writers
Officers of the Order of the British Empire
People educated at Aylesbury High School
People from Aylesbury Vale
Writers from Montreal
English people of French-Canadian descent
Canadian people of French descent
Women autobiographers